Masterbatch (MB) is a solid additive used for coloring (color masterbatch) or imparting other properties (additive masterbatch) to plastic. Masterbatch is a concentrated mixture of pigments and/or additives which is manufactured by encapsulation during a heat process or twin screw extrusion into a carrier matrix resin, which is then cooled and further cut into a granular shape. Masterbatch allows the processor to color raw polymer economically.

The alternatives to using masterbatches are buying a fully compounded material (which may be more expensive and less open to e.g. color variability of the product), or compounding from raw materials on site (which is prone to issues with achieving full dispersion of the colorants and additives, and prone to preparing more material than what is used for the production run). In comparison with pure pigments, masterbatches require more storage space and their lead times are longer. Another disadvantage is additional exposure of heat ("heat history") to both the carrier and the additive; this may be important, such as for marginally thermally stable pigments.

As masterbatches are already premixed compositions, their use alleviates the issues with insufficient dispersion or clumping of the additive or colorant. The concentration of the additive in the masterbatch is much higher than in the end-use polymer, but the additive is already properly dispersed in the host resin. In a way, their use is similar to the uses of ferroalloys for adding alloying elements to steels.

The use of masterbatches allows the factory to keep stock of fewer grades of the polymer, and to buy cheaper natural polymer in bulk.

The masterbatches can be highly concentrated (compared to the target composition), with high "let-down ratios"; for example, one 25 kg bag can be used for a ton of natural polymer. The relatively dilute nature of masterbatches, compared to the raw additives, allows higher accuracy in dosing small amounts of expensive components. The compact nature of the grains of solid masterbatches eliminates problems with dust, otherwise inherent for fine-grained solid additives. Solid masterbatches are also solvent-free. Therefore, they tend to have a longer shelf life as the solvent will not evaporate over time. The masterbatch usually contains 4065% of the additive, but the range can be as wide as 1580% in extreme cases.

The carrier material of the masterbatch can be based on a wax (universal carrier) or a specific polymer, identical or compatible with the natural polymer used (polymer-specific). Polymers such as EVA or LDPE can be used as carriers for polyolefins and nylon, polystyrene can be used for ABS, SAN, and sometimes polycarbonates. When a carrier different than the base plastic is used, the carrier material may modify the resulting plastic's properties; in which case the carrier resin has to be specified. The usual ratio of masterbatch to base resin is 15%. Several masterbatches (color and various additives) can be used together. The carrier can also double as a plasticizer (common for liquid masterbatches) or a processing aid.

The machines are usually fed with premixed granules of the host polymer and the masterbatch. The final mixing then gets done in the screw and extrusion part of the machine. This is sometimes prone to adverse effects, like the separation of the masterbatch and the base material in the machine's hopper. The masterbatch can be also added directly to the machine's screw, as a free-flowing solid or, if the masterbatch is liquid, by a peristaltic pump. Such use of liquid masterbatches allows highly accurate dosing and quick change of color between machine runs.

Masterbatches can be used in most processes, except rotational molding and Plastisol and other liquid resin systems.

Masterbatch production 

Masterbatches are produced in accordance with the required standards in the plastics industry and, if provided, to customer specifications. The general process for the manufacture of masterbatches involves the following steps:

the identification and weighing of the required pigments and/or additives,
the mixing of these pigments or additives into a carrier resin or polymer by heat treatment and twin-screw extrusion,
the cooling and forming of the concentrated mixture into granules, powders, and other masterbatch vehicles, and
the bagging of the final product.

Advantages of using masterbatches in plastic manufacturing 

Masterbatch brings some physical property improvements for the final plastic products:

 Productivity
 Masterbatch can increase volumetric output (as a result of thermal conductivity and volumetric expansion to temperature). In addition, it has the ability to downgauge due to higher film physical properties.
 Cost reduction
 With the large percentage of CaCO3 powder in components, Masterbatch helps manufacturers reduce material cost by using less energy to run the machine due to higher CaCO3 specific heat
 Masterbatch helps plastics to improve many physical properties such as,
 Toughness
 Flexural stiffness
 Adhesion
 Printability

It can also be used for applications where varying levels of permanent electrical conductivity are required for use in applications where the accumulation of static electrical charges can potentially cause problems.

Applications of masterbatches

Additive masterbatches modify various properties of the base plastic:
 ultraviolet light resistance
 flame retardant
 anti-fouling
 anti-static
 lubrication
 anti-slip
 corrosion inhibitors for metals packaged in plastic
 anti-microbials
 anti-oxidants / polymer stabilizers
 extrusion aids
 phosphorescence
 anti-counterfeit
 product security

Masterbatch is used in the following areas:

 Blown film and lamination
 PP raffia/Yarn
 PP non-woven fabric
 Blow molding
 Injection molding
 Thermoformed sheet
 HDPE/PP pipe extrusion
 Polyester and Nylon yarn

Manufacturers
 Americhem
 OptiColor, Inc.
 Wells Plastics
Techmer PM
 Europlas

Notes

Plastics
Dyes